Bill Munsey (May 5, 1941 – March 17, 2002) was an American player of Canadian football who played for the BC Lions of the CFL. He won the Grey Cup with them in 1964. He played college football previously with the University of Minnesota. In 2002, he died after a heart attack, aged 60.

References

1941 births
2002 deaths
BC Lions players
American players of Canadian football
Minnesota Golden Gophers football players
People from Uniontown, Pennsylvania
Sportspeople from Pennsylvania